Banten Sundanese or Bantenese (Basa Sunda Banten or Basa Wewengkon Banten) is one of the Sundanese dialect spoken predominantly by the Bantenese —an indigenous ethnic group native to Banten— in the westernmost hemisphere of Java island, and in the western Bogor Regency (especially in Jasinga, the districts of Cigudeg, Tenjo, Nanggung, Parungpanjang, and Sukajaya), as well as the northwestern parts of Sukabumi Regency. The Bantenese language is the lingua franca of the Ciptagelar people in the Kasepuhan Ciptagelar traditional community in the Cisolok district and the Kasepuhan Banten Kidul traditional community in the Lebak Regency.

The regional government of Banten is currently making a significant approach to preserve this dialect through a news program entitled Beja ti Lembur, which was aired by the regional CTV Banten network in Bantenese language.

Geographic distribution
Unlike any other native languages in Java island, the Bantenese language does not really recognized the sociolinguistic register in general, differed from the Priangan dialect spoken in the Parahyangan region. Due to its Priangan dialect, the Bantenese language somewhat seen as the sister language of Sundanese that is still closely related to the Old Sundanese language.

The Bantenese language is categorized or classified under the Sundanesic language family. This language is predominantly spoken in the southern region of Banten, which are Lebak, Pandeglang, dan part of the west and south Tangerang Regency. In the northern Serang Regency, this language is used daily by the people of Ciomas, Pabuaran, Padarincang, Cinangka, Baros, Petir, Cikeusal, Kopo, Cikande, Pamarayan and parts of Anyar subdistrict. The Priangan Banten somehow also used by Bantenese transmigrants in Central Lampung Regency, Lampung.

In Serang Regency, Bantenese language is used daily by the people of Anyar, Mancak, Waringinkurung, Taktakan, Cipocok Jaya, Walantaka, as well as Kragilan subdistrict. This language also used in some parts of Tangerang Regency, especially in its southern, southwestern, midwest and northern parts, as well as in cities of Tangerang and South Tangerang.

Language comparisons

Vocabulary

Phrases
Examples of comparison in phrases:

When making a statement

When inviting a female friend for a meal

When shopping

When showing

References

External links

Dialects of Sundanese

Sundanese language
Languages of Indonesia